Ab Khugan (also Romanized as Āb Khūgān and Āb Khīgān) is a village in Howmeh-ye Sharqi Rural District, in the Central District of Izeh County, Khuzestan Province, Iran. At the 2006 census, its population was 35, in 7 families.

References 

Populated places in Izeh County